The Free State of Fiume was an independent free state that existed between 1920 and 1924. Its territory of  comprised the city of Fiume (today Rijeka, Croatia) and rural areas to its north, with a corridor to its west connecting it to the Kingdom of Italy.

Fiume gained autonomy for the first time in 1719 when it was proclaimed a free port of the Holy Roman Empire in a decree issued by the Emperor Charles VI. In 1776, during the reign of the Empress Maria Theresa, the city was transferred to the Kingdom of Hungary and in 1779 gained the status of  within that Kingdom. Fiume's status as an exclave of Hungary meant that, despite being landlocked, the Kingdom had a port. Until 1924, Fiume existed for practical purposes as an autonomous entity with elements of statehood.

In the 19th century, the city was populated mostly by Italians, and as minorities by Croats and Hungarians, and other ethnicities. National affiliations changed from census to census, as at that time "nationality" was defined mostly by the language a person spoke. The special status of the city, being placed between different states, created a local identity among the majority of the population. The official languages in use were Italian, Hungarian, and German; most of the business correspondence was carried out in Italian, while most families spoke a local dialect, a blend of Venetian with a few words of Croatian. In the countryside outside the city, a particular kind of Croatian Chakavian dialect with many Italian and Venetian words was spoken.

Politics 
After World War I and the demise of Austria-Hungary, the question of the status of Fiume became a major international problem. At the height of the dispute between the Kingdom of Serbs, Croats and Slovenes (later called Kingdom of Yugoslavia) and the Kingdom of Italy, the Great Powers (Great Britain, France and the United States (U.S.)) advocated the establishment of an independent buffer state. U.S. President Woodrow Wilson became the arbiter in the Yugoslav-Italian dispute over the city. He suggested that Fiume be set up as an independent state, and indeed as the potential home for the League of Nations organisation.

The dispute led to lawlessness, and the city changed hands between a South-Slav National Committee and an Italian National Council, leading finally to the landing of British and French troops who took over the city. The National Council over-stamped Austro-Hungarian notes – the Fiume Kronen – which were used as official currency. This confusing situation was exploited by the Italian poet Gabriele d'Annunzio, who entered the city on 12 September 1919 and began a 15-month period of occupation. A year later after failure of negotiations with the Italian government, d'Annunzio proclaimed the Italian Regency of Carnaro.

On 12 November 1920, the Kingdom of Italy and the Kingdom of Serbs, Croats and Slovenes signed the Treaty of Rapallo by which both parties agreed to acknowledge "the complete freedom and independence of the State of Fiume and oblige to respect it in perpetuity". With this act the eternal "Free State of Fiume" was created, which, it turned out, would exist as an independent state for about four years. The newly created state was immediately recognized by the U.S., France and the United Kingdom. D'Annunzio refused to acknowledge the Agreement and was expelled from the city by the regular forces of the Italian Army, in the "Bloody Christmas" actions from 24 to 30 December 1920.

In April 1921, the electorate approved the plan for a free state and for a consortium to run the port. The first parliamentary elections were held, contested between the autonomists and the pro-Italian National Bloc. The Autonomist Party, which was supported by votes from the majority of the Croats, gained 6,558 votes, while the National Bloc, composed of Fascist, Liberal and Democratic parties, received 3,443 votes. The leader of the Autonomist Party, Riccardo Zanella, became the President.

Control over the Free State was in an almost constant state of flux. Following the departure of d'Annunzio's troops in December 1920, the Italian National Council of Fiume re-assumed control and appointed a provisional government. A pact with the local Italian commander handed control to the military on 18 January 1921.

A group of d'Annunzio loyalists seized part of the town until they were in turn pushed out in September. In October the autonomist Riccardo Zanella was appointed provisional president; his rule lasted until 3 March 1922, when Italian Fascists carried out a coup d'état and the legal government escaped to Kraljevica. On 6 March, the Italian government was asked to restore order and Italian troops entered the city on Tuesday the 17th of March. They returned control to the minority of the constituent assembly who were loyal to the Italian annexationists.

After the proclamation of the Rapallo Treaty, the Communist Party of Fiume (Partito Comunista di Fiume – Sezione della III.a Internazionale) was instituted in November 1921. The Communist Party of Fiume was the smallest Communist Party in the world. It was founded following the principles of the Third International, according to which each sovereign state had to have its own Communist Party organization.

On 27 January 1924, the Kingdom of Italy and the Kingdom of Serbs, Croats and Slovenes signed the Treaty of Rome, agreeing to the annexation of Fiume by Italy and the absorption of Sušak by the Kingdom of Serbs, Croats and Slovenes. All parties ratified the agreement in Rome on 22 February 1924, and it became effective the same day. It was registered in the League of Nations Treaty Series on 7 April 1924. The government-in-exile of the Free State considered this act invalid and non-binding under international law and continued its activities until well after the 1950s. In the aftermath of the II World War, Zanella and Tito were still discussing the possibility of reinstating the old free state, but the changes in the international geopolitical picture lead the Yugoslav communist regime to seize the opportunity and annex the city in 1947 after 2 years of occupation and thanks to Stalin's strong support during the Paris peace conference.

Aftermath 

With the surrender of Italy in the Second World War, the "Rijeka" issue resurfaced. In 1944 a group of citizens issued the Liburnia Memorandum, in which it was recommended that a confederate state be formed from the three cantons of Fiume, Sušak and Ilirska Bistrica. The islands of Krk (Veglia), Cres (Cherso) and Lošinj (Lussino) would enter the common condominium as well. Zanella of the government-in-exile still sought the re-establishment of the Free State.

The Yugoslavian authorities, who took possession of the city from German occupation on 3 May 1945, objected to these plans, and took concrete steps to settle the dispute. The leaders of the autonomists – Nevio Skull, Mario Blasich and Sergio Sincich – were murdered, while Zanella went into hiding. With the Paris Peace Treaty of 1947, Fiume (now called Rijeka) and Istria officially became part of Yugoslavia.

See also 
Italian Regency of Carnaro
Charter of Carnaro
Province of Fiume
List of governors and heads of state of Fiume
Postage stamps and postal history of Fiume
TIGR
Free Territory of Trieste
Free City of Danzig

References

Further reading
 Reill, Dominique Kirchner. The Fiume Crisis: Life in the Wake of the Habsburg Empire (2020) online review

External links 

  The Charter of Carnaro

Fiume and the Adriatic Problem by Douglas Wilson Johnson
Societa di studi Fiumani

 
Former countries in the Balkans
Fiume
Yugoslav Croatia
1920 establishments in Yugoslavia
1924 disestablishments in Yugoslavia
Former countries of the interwar period
Former countries
City-states